The alkali metals react with oxygen to form several different compounds: suboxides, oxides, peroxides, sesquioxides, superoxides, and ozonides.  They all react violently with water.

Alkali metal suboxides

Hexarubidium monoxide (Rb6O) h
Nonarubidium dioxide (Rb9O2)
Tricaesium monoxide (Cs3O) is a dark green solid.
Tetracaesium monoxide (Cs4O)
Heptacaesium monoxide (Cs7O)
Tricaesium dioxide (Cs3O2)
Heptacaesium dioxide (Cs7O2)
Undecacaesium trioxide (Cs11O3)
Undecacaesium monorubidium trioxide (Cs11RbO3)
Undecacaesium dirubidium trioxide (Cs11Rb2O3)
Undecacaesium trirubidium trioxide (Cs11Rb3O3)

Alkali metal oxides

Lithium oxide (Li2O) is the lightest alkali metal oxide and a white solid.  It melts at 1570 °C.
Sodium oxide (Na2O) is a white solid that melts at 1132 °C and decomposes at 1950 °C.  It is a component of glass.
Potassium oxide (K2O) is a pale yellow solid that decomposes at 350 °C.
Rubidium oxide (Rb2O) is a yellow solid that melts at 500 °C.
Caesium oxide (Cs2O) is a yellow-orange solid that melts at 490 °C.

Alkali metal peroxides

Lithium peroxide (Li2O2) is a white solid that melts at 195 °C.  It reacts with carbon dioxide to form lithium carbonate and oxygen.
Sodium peroxide (Na2O2) is a pale yellow solid that melts at 460 °C and decomposes at 657 °C.
Potassium peroxide (K2O2) is a yellow solid that melts at 490 °C.
Rubidium peroxide (Rb2O2) is produced when rubidium stands in air.
Caesium peroxide (Cs2O2) is produced by the decomposition of caesium oxide above 400 °C.

Alkali metal sesquioxides
Rubidium sesquioxide (Rb4O6)is a black solid.
Caesium sesquioxide (Cs4O6)is a black solid.

Alkali metal superoxides

Lithium superoxide (LiO2) has only been isolated in matrix isolation at 15 K.
Sodium superoxide (NaO2) is a yellow-orange solid that melts at 551.7 °C.  It is made by the high-pressure oxidation of sodium peroxide.
Potassium superoxide (KO2) is a yellow solid that decomposes at 560 °C.  It is used as a CO2 scrubber, H2O dehumidifier, and O2 generator in rebreathers, spacecraft, submarines, and spacesuit life support systems.
Rubidium superoxide (RbO2) is produced when rubidium burns in air.
Caesium superoxide (CsO2) is produced when caesium burns in air.

Alkali metal ozonides
Lithium ozonide (LiO3) is a red solid which is produced from caesium ozonide via an ion-exchange process.
Sodium ozonide (NaO3) is a red solid which is produced from caesium ozonide via an ion-exchange process.
Potassium ozonide (KO3) is a dark red solid which is produced when potassium is burned in ozone or exposed to air for years.
Rubidium ozonide (RbO3) is a dark red solid which is produced when rubidium is burned in ozone.
Caesium ozonide (CsO3) is a dark red solid which is produced when caesium is burned in ozone.

References

Alkali metals
Oxides